Ferdinand Martin Gomez Romualdez (born November 14, 1963) is a Filipino businessman, lawyer and politician serving as the Speaker of the House of Representatives since July 25, 2022. He is also serving as the representative for the 1st district of Leyte since 2019 and previously from 2007 to 2016. He formerly served as the House Majority Leader from 2019 to 2022, and unsuccessfully ran for senator in the 2016 elections. He is a first cousin of President Bongbong Marcos

Romualdez is the owner of newspaper companies Manila Standard and the Journal Group of Publications and mass media firm Philippine Collective Media Corporation. He is also the national president of the Lakas-Christian Muslim Democrats political party.

Early life and education 
Ferdinand Martin Gomez Romualdez is the third child of former Leyte governor and ambassador to the United States Benjamin Romualdez and Juliette Gomez-Romualdez. His father was once named by Forbes as the 30th richest man in the Philippines with a net worth of P3.3 billion, which the Presidential Commission on Good Government claimed was allegedly ill-gotten. He is the nephew of former first lady Imelda Romualdez Marcos and former president Ferdinand Marcos, while incumbent President Bongbong and Senator Imee Marcos are his cousins.

Romualdez attended Cornell University in the United States from 1981 to 1985, graduating with a Bachelor of Arts in government. In 1988, he earned a Certificate of Special Studies in Administration and Management from Harvard University. He later enrolled at the University of the Philippines College of Law in 1988, where he became a member of the Upsilon Sigma Phi fraternity. He earned his Bachelor of Laws degree in 1992. He was admitted to the bar in 1993.

In 1992, Romualdez was appointed as concurrent trustee and president of the Doña Remedios Trinidad Romualdez Medical Foundation and Dr. Vicente Orestes Romualdez Educational Foundation, both of which are owned by his family.

In 1995, he started work as director and legal counsel for the CARPA Realty Development Corporation. Prior to his political career, Romualdez served as chairman of the board for Equitable PCI Bank.

Political career 
Romualdez authored House Bill No. 1039, which was enacted into law by President Benigno Aquino III as Republic Act No. 10754 or an act on expanding the benefits and privileges of people with disabilities.

In April 2014, Romualdez expressed his interest to run as senator in the 2016 elections. He filed his certificate of candidacy for senator on October 13, 2015. In November 7, 2015, Romualdez declared his support for presidential candidate Jejomar Binay. In 2016 Davao City mayor and presidential aspirant Rodrigo Duterte also endorsed the candidacy of Romualdez. He ran under the Lakas–CMD party, of which he is the national president, but ultimately failed to win a senate seat.

In the 2019 elections, Romualdez again won as representative of Leyte's 1st congressional district. Romualdez was later elected House Majority Leader of the 18th Congress.

On July 10, 2020, Martin and his wife Yedda Romualdez were among the 70 congressmen who voted "yes" to reject the franchise renewal of ABS-CBN.

In November 2022, Romualdez, along with six other lawmakers, filed House Bill 6398 proposing the creation of the Maharlika Investment Fund, a sovereign wealth fund for the Philippines inspired from South Korea's Korea Investment Corporation. The proposal drew mixed reactions from economists and mostly negative reactions from the general public.

Personal life

Romualdez is married to Yedda Marie M. Kittilstvedt, who represented the Philippines for Miss International 1996. They have four children together.

References

|-

|-

1963 births
Cornell University alumni
Harvard University alumni
Lakas–CMD politicians
Living people
Majority leaders of the House of Representatives of the Philippines
Members of the House of Representatives of the Philippines from Leyte (province)
People from Manila
Martin
Speakers of the House of Representatives of the Philippines
University of the Philippines alumni